The Letter is the sixth studio album by American singer Avant. It was released by Verve Forecast Records on December 21, 2010 in the United States. The singer worked with The Avila Brothers, Mike City, duo The Pentagon, and others on The Letter which debuted and peaked at number 119 on the US Billboard 200, becoming his lowest-charting album to date. It produced three singles, including "Kiss Goodbye", "Your Body is the Business" and "Graduated."

Background
Speaking in January 2011 to noted UK R&B writer Pete Lewis, assistant editor of Blues & Soul, Avant described his reasons for titling the album The Letter as being because it represents "a letter from me to my fans, to tell them what's going on in my life, what's going through my head, and my struggles as a man."

Critical reception

Andy Kellman from Allmusic rated the album two and a half stars out of five. He wrote that "to put it lightly, none of these songs deserve placement in a best-of-Avant playlist. Otherwise, The Letter offers another ballad-heavy round of smooth, sophisticated, and occasionally raunchy R&B songs [...] for the thirty and up crowd. It's not one of the singer's best albums, but those who can wade through the miscues will have an EP's worth of solid Avant."

Track listing

Charts

References

2010 albums
Avant albums
Verve Forecast Records albums